Savar may refer to:
 Savar, East Azerbaijan
 Savar-e Bala, Golestan Province
 Savar-e Pain, Golestan Province
 Savar-e Vasat, Golestan Province
 Savar, Lorestan
 Savar, South Khorasan